Seydlitz, von Seydlitz or von Seidlitz is a surname of Prussian, Silesian, Thuringian, Saxon and Polish nobility. It may refer to:

People
Friedrich Wilhelm von Seydlitz (1721–1773), a Prussian general of the cavalry
Józef Seydlitz (1755–1835), a Polish military commander and a colonel of the Polish Army
Woldemar von Seidlitz (1850–1922), an art historian
Walther von Seydlitz-Kurzbach (1888–1976), a German general

Ships
, a 25,000 ton battlecruiser of the Imperial German Navy
German cruiser Seydlitz, a heavy World War II cruiser that was never completed
, a World War II Vorpostenboot

Other 
Seidlitz powders, a laxative and digestion regulator named after the town of Sedlec, Czech Republic